Channon both a given name and a surname. Notable people with the name include:

 Channon Roe (born 1969), American actor
 Henry Channon (1897–1958), politician and diarist (Chips Channon) 
 Jim Channon (1939–2017), US army officer
 Mick Channon (born 1948), footballer
 Paul Channon, Baron Kelvedon (1935–2007), politician (son of Henry Chips Channon)

See also
 Murders of Channon Christian and Christopher Newsom
 The Channon, New South Wales